USS Tripoli (LHA-7) is the second  built for the United States Navy. On 7 May 2012, United States Secretary of the Navy Ray Mabus announced the ship's name as Tripoli, in honor of the US Marine Corps victory against Tripoli at the Battle of Derna during the First Barbary War. This is the third US Naval ship to carry the name, the first being , an escort carrier from World War II and the second being , an amphibious assault ship that served during the Cold War.

Design and construction
Approximately 45% of the Flight 0 design is based on LHD-8, with the well deck removed to allow more room for aircraft and aviation fuel. The removal of the well deck for landing craft allows for an extended hangar deck with two significantly wider high bay areas, each fitted with an overhead crane for aircraft maintenance.

Other enhancements include a reconfigurable command and control complex, an on-board hospital, and numerous aviation support spaces.  The design of Tripoli features an enlarged hangar deck, realignment and expansion of the aviation maintenance facilities, and a significant increase in her available stowage for parts and support equipment. She was intended to be the first LHA replacement ship to deliver fully ready to integrate the entire future air combat element of the U.S. Marine Corps to include the F-35B Lightning II, but construction delays have pushed final F-35 capability installs until delivery.

Tripoli was built by Ingalls Shipbuilding (Huntington Ingalls Industries) at the company's shipyard in Pascagoula, Mississippi. Fabrication of ship components began in July 2013, and the ship's keel was laid in a ceremony on 20 June 2014 in Pascagoula. Tripoli was launched on 1 May and later christened on 16 September 2017, with Lynne Mabus, wife of former Navy Secretary Ray Mabus, as her sponsor.

By 2019, Tripoli was about a year behind production schedules. The ship was delivered to the Navy on 28 February 2020.

Covid pandemic
During the COVID-19 pandemic, on 17 April 2020, The Wall Street Journal reported that Navy officials had stated that at least 9 sailors assigned to the ship had tested positive for SARS-CoV-2.  At the time, the ship was docked in Pascagoula. About 630 sailors were moved off the ship as a preventative measure, which resulted in the outbreak spreading to only "around a couple dozen sailors". As a result of the pandemic, the ship's public commissioning ceremony originally planned to occur at NAS Pensacola in June was also cancelled. Subsequently, Tripoli was commissioned on 15 July 2020 in Pascagoula, Mississippi, where the ship was built.

Ship's history
In September 2020, Tripoli completed a homeport shift from Pascagoula, Mississippi to San Diego, California.

On 2 May 2022, Tripoli departed Naval Station San Diego for the Western Pacific Ocean on her maiden deployment, taking on 20 F-35Bs at one point in a test of the "lightning carrier" concept. On 25 July 2022, she transitioned to an amphibious ready role by embarking the 31st Marine Expeditionary Unit at Naval Base Okinawa, Japan, before transiting the South China Sea to make a port call at Singapore's Changi Naval Base on 31 Aug 2022.

Etymology
Tripoli is the third U.S. Navy ship named for the Battle of Derne in 1805. It was the decisive victory of a mercenary army led by a detachment of United States Marines and soldiers against the forces of Tripoli during the First Barbary War. It was the first recorded land battle of the United States fought overseas. Fallujah, after the Second Battle of Fallujah, was suggested as a name but was ultimately not chosen. This name was given to another America-class ship, .

Gallery

Notes

References

External links
Huntington Ingalls Shipbuilding: America-class of Amphibious Assault Ships

 

Tripoli
2017 ships
Naval ships involved in the COVID-19 pandemic